Aegiphila fasciculata is a species of tree or shrub in the family Lamiaceae. It is native to Brazil. It grows primarily in the seasonally dry tropical biomes.

References

fluminensis
Vulnerable plants